The 2010–11 NBL season was the 33rd season of competition since its establishment in 1979. A total of nine teams contested the league. The regular season was played between October 2010 and April 2011, followed by a post-season involving the top four. On 23 February 2010, it was announced that the Sydney Kings would return in 2010–11. The schedule was announced on 27 May 2010.

Broadcast rights during the off-season reverted from subscription channel Fox Sports to free-to-air network Channel Ten and its digital sports sister station One HD in a five-year deal, through to the 2014–15 season. In New Zealand, Sky Sport once again provided coverage, replacing Maori TV.

On 13 September 2010, iiNet was announced as the league naming rights sponsor and Centrebet as the official sports betting partner. Spalding provide equipment including the official game ball, with AND1 supplying team apparel.

Preseason 

NBL Top End Challenge, a round robin competition with a final series, involving all nine sides, will begin on 28 September in Alice Springs and continue in Darwin, Northern Territory from 30 September. Wollongong Hawks are defending pre-season champions.

Melbourne Tigers pre-season

Belfast International Basketball Classic

Lu'An Invitational

Group stage

Semi-finals

Third-place playoff

Final 

New Zealand Breakers win Lu'An Invitational.

Wollongong Hawks pre-season

Sydney Kings pre-season

Perth Wildcats pre-season

Gold Coast Blaze pre-season

Cairns Taipans pre-season

Adelaide 36ers pre-season

Townsville Crocodiles pre-season

Friendship Games

NBL Top End Challenge 

Perth Wildcats win Top End Challenge.

New Zealand Breakers pre-season

Regular season
The 2010–11 regular season took place over 25 rounds between 28 October 2010 and 2 April 2011.

Round 1

|- bgcolor="#CCCCFF" font size=1
!width=90| Date
!width=180| Home
!width=60| Score
!width=180| Away
!width=260| Venue
!width=70| Crowd
!width=70| Boxscore

Round 2

|- bgcolor="#CCCCFF" font size=1
!width=90| Date
!width=180| Home
!width=60| Score
!width=180| Away
!width=260| Venue
!width=70| Crowd
!width=70| Boxscore

Round 3

|- bgcolor="#CCCCFF" font size=1
!width=90| Date
!width=180| Home
!width=60| Score
!width=180| Away
!width=260| Venue
!width=70| Crowd
!width=70| Boxscore

Round 4

|- bgcolor="#CCCCFF" font size=1
!width=90| Date
!width=180| Home
!width=60| Score
!width=180| Away
!width=260| Venue
!width=70| Crowd
!width=70| Boxscore

Round 5

|- bgcolor="#CCCCFF" font size=1
!width=90| Date
!width=180| Home
!width=60| Score
!width=180| Away
!width=260| Venue
!width=70| Crowd
!width=70| Boxscore

Round 6

|- bgcolor="#CCCCFF" font size=1
!width=90| Date
!width=180| Home
!width=60| Score
!width=180| Away
!width=260| Venue
!width=70| Crowd
!width=70| Boxscore

Round 7

|- bgcolor="#CCCCFF" font size=1
!width=90| Date
!width=180| Home
!width=60| Score
!width=180| Away
!width=260| Venue
!width=70| Crowd
!width=70| Boxscore

Round 8

|- bgcolor="#CCCCFF" font size=1
!width=90| Date
!width=180| Home
!width=60| Score
!width=180| Away
!width=260| Venue
!width=70| Crowd
!width=70| Boxscore

Round 9

|- bgcolor="#CCCCFF" font size=1
!width=90| Date
!width=180| Home
!width=60| Score
!width=180| Away
!width=260| Venue
!width=70| Crowd
!width=70| Boxscore

Round 10

|- bgcolor="#CCCCFF" font size=1
!width=90| Date
!width=180| Home
!width=60| Score
!width=180| Away
!width=260| Venue
!width=70| Crowd
!width=70| Boxscore

Round 11

|- bgcolor="#CCCCFF" font size=1
!width=90| Date
!width=180| Home
!width=60| Score
!width=180| Away
!width=260| Venue
!width=70| Crowd
!width=70| Boxscore

Round 12

|- bgcolor="#CCCCFF" font size=1
!width=90| Date
!width=180| Home
!width=60| Score
!width=180| Away
!width=260| Venue
!width=70| Crowd
!width=70| Boxscore

Round 13

|- bgcolor="#CCCCFF" font size=1
!width=90| Date
!width=180| Home
!width=60| Score
!width=180| Away
!width=260| Venue
!width=70| Crowd
!width=70| Boxscore

Round 14

|- bgcolor="#CCCCFF" font size=1
!width=90| Date
!width=180| Home
!width=60| Score
!width=180| Away
!width=260| Venue
!width=70| Crowd
!width=70| Boxscore

Round 15

|- bgcolor="#CCCCFF" font size=1
!width=90| Date
!width=180| Home
!width=60| Score
!width=180| Away
!width=260| Venue
!width=70| Crowd
!width=70| Boxscore

Round 16

|- bgcolor="#CCCCFF" font size=1
!width=90| Date
!width=180| Home
!width=60| Score
!width=180| Away
!width=260| Venue
!width=70| Crowd
!width=70| Boxscore

Round 17

|- bgcolor="#CCCCFF" font size=1
!width=90| Date
!width=180| Home
!width=60| Score
!width=180| Away
!width=260| Venue
!width=70| Crowd
!width=70| Boxscore

Round 18

|- bgcolor="#CCCCFF" font size=1
!width=90| Date
!width=180| Home
!width=60| Score
!width=180| Away
!width=260| Venue
!width=70| Crowd
!width=70| Boxscore

Round 19

|- bgcolor="#CCCCFF" font size=1
!width=90| Date
!width=180| Home
!width=60| Score
!width=180| Away
!width=260| Venue
!width=70| Crowd
!width=70| Boxscore

Round 20

|- bgcolor="#CCCCFF" font size=1
!width=90| Date
!width=180| Home
!width=60| Score
!width=180| Away
!width=260| Venue
!width=70| Crowd
!width=70| Boxscore

Round 21

|- bgcolor="#CCCCFF" font size=1
!width=90| Date
!width=180| Home
!width=60| Score
!width=180| Away
!width=260| Venue
!width=70| Crowd
!width=70| Boxscore

Round 22

|- bgcolor="#CCCCFF" font size=1
!width=90| Date
!width=180| Home
!width=60| Score
!width=180| Away
!width=260| Venue
!width=70| Crowd
!width=70| Boxscore

Round 23

|- bgcolor="#CCCCFF" font size=1
!width=90| Date
!width=180| Home
!width=60| Score
!width=180| Away
!width=260| Venue
!width=70| Crowd
!width=70| Boxscore

Round 24

|- bgcolor="#CCCCFF" font size=1
!width=90| Date
!width=180| Home
!width=60| Score
!width=180| Away
!width=260| Venue
!width=70| Crowd
!width=70| Boxscore

Cairns vs. Perth was moved from 4 February 2011 to 26 March 2011 due to Cyclone Yasi.

Round 25

|- bgcolor="#CCCCFF" font size=1
!width=90| Date
!width=180| Home
!width=60| Score
!width=180| Away
!width=260| Venue
!width=70| Crowd
!width=70| Boxscore

Ladder

The NBL tie-breaker system as outlined in the NBL Rules and Regulations states that in the case of an identical win–loss record, the results in games played between the teams will determine order of seeding.

1Cairns Taipans won Head-to-Head (3-1).

Finals 

The 2010–11 National Basketball League Finals will be played between 7 April 2011 and 29 April 2011, consisting of two best-of-three semi-final and final series, where the higher seed hosts the first and, if necessary, third game.

Playoff Seedings

 New Zealand Breakers
 Townsville Crocodiles
 Cairns Taipans
 Perth Wildcats

The NBL tie-breaker system as outlined in the NBL Rules and Regulations states that in the case of an identical win–loss record, the results in games played between the two teams will determine order of seeding.

Under that system, Cairns will finish third (3–1), and Perth fourth (1–3).

Playoff bracket

Semi-finals

|- bgcolor="#CCCCFF" font size=1
!width=90| Date
!width=180| Home
!width=60| Score
!width=180| Away
!width=260| Venue
!width=70| Crowd
!width=70| Boxscore

Grand Final

|- bgcolor="#CCCCFF" font size=1
!width=90| Date
!width=180| Home
!width=60| Score
!width=180| Away
!width=260| Venue
!width=70| Crowd
!width=70| Boxscore

Season statistics

Statistics leaders

Note: regular season only

Top 10 Attendances

Awards

Player of the Week

Player of the Month

Coach of the Month

Season
The end-of-season awards ceremony was held in the Palladium Room at Crown Casino in Melbourne on Monday, 4 April 2011.

Most Valuable Player (Andrew Gaze Trophy): Gary Ervin, Wollongong Hawks
Rookie of the Year: Ben Madgen, Sydney Kings
Best Defensive Player: Damian Martin, Perth Wildcats
Best Sixth Man: Kevin Braswell, New Zealand Breakers
Most Improved Player: Oscar Forman, Wollongong Hawks
Coach of the Year (Lindsay Gaze Trophy): Trevor Gleeson, Townsville Crocodiles
Referee of the Year: Michael Aylen
All-NBL First Team:
Gary Ervin – Wollongong Hawks
Damian Martin – Perth Wildcats
Kirk Penney – New Zealand Breakers
Gary Wilkinson – New Zealand Breakers
Julian Khazzouh – Sydney Kings
All-NBL Second Team:
Corey Williams – Melbourne Tigers
Adam Gibson – Gold Coast Blaze
Glen Saville – Wollongong Hawks
Ira Clark – Gold Coast Blaze
Luke Schenscher – Townsville Crocodiles
All-NBL Third Team:
Ayinde Ubaka – Cairns Taipans
Peter Crawford – Townsville Crocodiles
Shawn Redhage – Perth Wildcats
Alex Loughton – Cairns Taipans
Adam Ballinger – Adelaide 36ers

Finals
Grand Final Series MVP (Larry Sengstock Medal): Thomas Abercrombie, New Zealand Breakers

References

External links
 Player of the week archive
 NBL news archive from April 2011

 
Australia,NBL
2010–11 in Australian basketball
2011 in New Zealand basketball
2010 in New Zealand basketball